Derek Landri (born September 21, 1983) is a former American football defensive lineman. He was drafted by the Jacksonville Jaguars in the fifth round of the 2007 NFL Draft. He played college football at Notre Dame.

Landri also played for the Carolina Panthers, Philadelphia Eagles and Tampa Bay Buccaneers.

Early years
Named Mr. California for the highest award for California high school players, Landri played high school football for De La Salle where he was Maurice Jones-Drew's teammate.

Professional career

Jacksonville Jaguars
Landri's selection by the Jacksonville Jaguars in the 5th round was rated one of the "Top 10 Draft Steals" of the 2007 draft by Sports Illustrated.

Playing in a reserve role, Landri recorded a sack and an interception on Pittsburgh Steelers quarterback Ben Roethlisberger during the Jaguars' Wildcard playoff game on January 5, 2008. He also recovered a fumble which sealed the win for the Jaguars. On December 3, 2009, Landri was waived by the Jaguars.

Carolina Panthers
Landri was claimed off waivers by the Carolina Panthers on December 4, 2009. He became an unrestricted free agent following the 2010 season.

Philadelphia Eagles
Landri was signed by the Philadelphia Eagles on August 3, 2011. He was released on September 3 during final roster cuts. Following a season-ending injury to Antonio Dixon, Landri was re-signed on October 3. Following the 2011 season, Landri became an unrestricted free agent, but was re-signed to a one-year contract on April 9, 2012.

Tampa Bay Buccaneers
Landri signed a two-year, $3.25 million contract with the Tampa Bay Buccaneers on March 30, 2013. He was released on February 10, 2014.

References

External links
 ESPN Page 2 - Fleming: Jacksonville's uber-sub - A lineman who's ready for his close-up

1983 births
Living people
American football defensive tackles
Notre Dame Fighting Irish football players
Jacksonville Jaguars players
Carolina Panthers players
Philadelphia Eagles players
Tampa Bay Buccaneers players
People from Newport Beach, California
Players of American football from California
De La Salle High School (Concord, California) alumni